Yamal-300K is a geostationary communications satellite operated by Gazprom Space Systems and built by ISS Reshetnev on the Ekspress-1000 satellite bus. It was the first switch of satellite supplier in Yamal programme after Gazprom had disagreements on the schedule and cost of Yamal-301 and Yamal-302 with RSC Energia. It is a  satellite with 5.6 kW of power on an unpressurized bus designed for direct geostationary orbit injection with 14 years of design life. Its payload was supplied by Thales Alenia Space and is composed of 8 x 72 MHz C-band and 18 x 72 MHz Ku-band transponders for a 36 MHz equivalent of 52 transponders. Its transmitted power is 110 watts in C-band and 140 watts in Ku-band.

Launch 
Yamal-300K was launched along Luch 5B on 2 November 2012 at 21:04:00 UTC from Baikonur Site 81/23 by a Proton-M / Briz-M directly to geostationary orbit. The launch and satellite deployment was successful and Yamal-300K was commissioned into service.

Mission 
As of 12 May 2020, it is still in service, but has been moved to 183° East (177° West).

See also 

 Luch 5B – Satellite that was launched together with Yamal-300K
 Yamal – Communication satellite family operated by Gazprom Space Systems
 Gazprom Space Systems – Satellite communication division of the Russian oil giant Gazprom
 Ekspress (satellite bus) – The satellite bus on which Yamal-300K is based
 ISS Reshetnev – The designer and manufacturer of the Yamal-300K satellite

References

External links 
  Gazkom Yamal-300K technical performance
 ISS Reshetnev Yamal-300K page

Yamal-300K
Spacecraft launched in 2012
Satellites using the Ekspress bus
2012 in Russia
Spacecraft launched by Proton rockets